Interstate 394 (I-394) is a small east–west auxiliary Interstate Highway in Hennepin County in the US state of Minnesota. It is also commonly referred to by its pre-1991 name, Wayzata Boulevard, and by its other designation, US Highway 12 (US 12). At its western terminus, the roadway loses its Interstate designation but continues as US 12. I-394 serves as the most direct link for commuters and other drivers who are traveling between downtown Minneapolis and parts of the western Minneapolis–Saint Paul metropolitan area.

I-394 maintains at least three lanes in each direction except under the Minnesota State Highway 100 (MN 100) interchange and also between I-94/US 52 and its eastern terminus downtown.

Route description

I-394 begins on the western side of the Twin Cities in the suburb of Minnetonka, at its interchange with I-494 (exit 19). From there, I-394 takes a  course toward downtown Minneapolis where the eastern terminus is at 4th Street North.

Legally, the route of I-394 is defined as unmarked legislative routes 10 and 107 in Minnesota Statutes §§ 161.114(2) and 161.115(38). I-394 is not marked with these legislative numbers along the actual highway.

E-ZPass Minnesota toll lanes
There are two high-occupancy toll (HOT) express lanes at the center of the road. Prior to May 16, 2005, they had been traditional high-occupancy vehicle (HOV, or carpool) lanes, allowing busses, motorcycles, and vehicles with two or more occupants to use them during rush-hour periods, while single-occupancy vehicles were not permitted. Now, drivers riding alone can use the lanes at any time but must have an E-ZPass Minnesota electronic toll collection transponder in order to pay for using the express portions.

From I-494 to MN 100, the lanes of I-394 are separated from traffic by double white lines. Between MN 100 and I-94/US 52 near downtown, the two lanes are combined into a reversible expressway in the median that is separated from the eastbound and westbound lanes by concrete barriers. This segment changes directions to accommodate the traffic flow at different times of day, so, in the morning, it is open to downtown-bound eastward flowing traffic, while it is open to westbound traffic in the evening.

An E-ZPass Minnesota electronic transponder is required in order to pay tolls because there are no tollbooths on the roadway. The price varies depending on the time of day and flow of traffic. Lone drivers were previously allowed to use the express lanes in off-peak times, but this is no longer allowed under the new system unless the sign says the cost is "OPEN", meaning free. The decision to make the nonreversible lanes free on off-hours was reached due to complaints about essentially making a four-lane freeway in an area that, even on off-hours, sorely needed six. Toll rates are expected to generally fall between $1.00 and $4.00, with a potential maximum of $8.00. Off-hours are charged as $0.25 on the reversible lanes and free on the one-way lanes. The white line-separated and reversible expressway sections are priced separately. The lanes are still open free to busses, motorcycles, and cars with two or more people, no matter the time of day, and such vehicles do not require transponders to use the lanes.

Using the express lanes as a lone driver without a transponder during charged periods or crossing the double white lines will result in a large fine placed upon the driver. To enter and exit properly, vehicles must use an entry point without double white lines. The line rule is true even when the lane is free of charge.

Transponders began to be sold a few weeks before the May 16, 2005, opening date. By June 2005, about 6,500 drivers had signed up for the system.

History

The highway, a four lane divided highway, used to be designated as Wayzata Boulevard and US 12. The construction of I-394 was authorized in 1968. Funding became available after the canceled I-335 freeway project in 1978. I-335 had been planned to be a northern loop around downtown Minneapolis that would have passed through northeast Minneapolis. The money was substituted to the I-394 project. Wayzata Boulevard/US 12, starting in 1982, was to be redesigned as I-394. Construction of I-394 occurred mainly in the 1980s, starting at the western terminus in Minnetonka and opening in sections toward downtown Minneapolis throughout the late 1980s. The entire route of I-394 was officially opened in 1991.

A former lane drop of I-394 at the Penn Avenue exit was eliminated in 2000.

Exit list

References

External links

MnPASS
Information about I-394 at interstate-guide.com
I-394 Hennepin County

Auxiliary Interstate Highways
Interstate Highways in Minnesota
Interstate 394
3
394
Interstate 94-3
Interstate 94-3
94-3